Beatmapping is the detection of a beat or tempo in music using software. Beatmapping visually lays out/displays the tempo (speed) of music throughout the entirety or portion of a song or music piece. This "mapping" is done with software specifically designed for beatmapping.

Beatmapping software is often a component of music editing and mixing software like Apple's Logic Pro 9 or Mix Meister. A benefit of beatmapping when mixing music is that it keeps the project in time with the metronome tempo which is the steady underlying base beat of the music. Beatmapping software is also often used to help develop a beat to use underlying with a live music performance and "objects" are added to the map of beats that set a change in tempo matching changes in music during the live performance.

References

Acoustics
Acoustics software
Interference
Oscillation
Time–frequency analysis